Sabzi (literally "greenness; greens") may refer to:

People
 Sabzi (musician), American hip-hop musician
 Sabzi (artist), Iranian abstract impressionist painter

Places

Sabz Burj, Nizamuddin, a monument in New Delhi, India
Sabzi, Bagh-e Malek, a village in Khuzestan Province, Iran
Sabzi, Izeh, a village in Khuzestan Province, Iran
Sabzi, Shushtar, a village in Khuzestan Province, Iran
Sabzi, West Azerbaijan, a village in West Azerbaijan Province, Iran

Culinary uses
 In Indian cuisine, a vegetable cooked in gravy, also spelled sabji
 Sabzi khordan, in Iranian cuisine, referring to vegetable greens as well as herbs and other vegetables
 Ghormeh sabzi, a popular Iranian dish considered the national dish of Iran